Abdelkader Hachlaf (born 3 August 1978) is a Moroccan runner who specializes in the 3000 metres steeplechase. He was suspended between April 2004 and April 2006 after testing positive for the banned substance nandrolone in an IAAF out-of-competition test.

Achievements

Personal bests
1500 metres – 3:33.59 min (2001)
3000 metres – 8:04.88 min (2006)
5000 metres – 13:39.75 min (2007)
3000 metres steeplechase – 8:08.78 min (2006)

See also
List of sportspeople sanctioned for doping offences

References

External links
 
 
 
 

1978 births
Living people
Moroccan male middle-distance runners
Olympic athletes of Morocco
Athletes (track and field) at the 2008 Summer Olympics
Moroccan sportspeople in doping cases
Doping cases in athletics
Moroccan male steeplechase runners
World Athletics Championships athletes for Morocco
Mediterranean Games gold medalists for Morocco
Mediterranean Games medalists in athletics
Athletes (track and field) at the 2001 Mediterranean Games
20th-century Moroccan people
21st-century Moroccan people